The Rana Pratap Sagar Dam is a gravity masonry dam of  height built on the Chambal River at Rawatbhata in Rajasthan in India. It is part of integrated scheme of a cascade development of the river involving four projects starting with the Gandhi Sagar Dam in the upstream reach ( upstream) in Madhya Pradesh and the Jawahar Sagar Dam on the downstream ( downstream) with a terminal structure of the Kota Barrage ( further downstream) in Rajasthan for irrigation.

The direct benefit from the dam is hydropower generation of 172 MW (with four units of 43 MW capacity each) at the dam toe powerhouse adjoining the spillway, with releases received from the Gandhi Sagar Dam and the additional storage created at the dam by the intercepted catchment area. The estimated generation potential of 473.0 GWh of generation has been exceeded in most years since its commissioning. The power station was officially declared open on 9 February 1970 by Indira Gandhi, the then Prime Minister of India. The dam and power plant are named after the warrior Maharaja Rana Pratap of Rajasthan.

Geography

The dam is located on the Chambal River near Rawatbhata in Rajasthan.

It flows north-northeast through Madhya Pradesh, runs for a time through Rajasthan, then forms the boundary between Rajasthan and Madhya Pradesh before turning southeast to join the Yamuna River in Uttar Pradesh state. The Gandhi Sagar Dam is located in the middle reach of the gorge section of the river and affords good storage facility. For the next (the river flows through the Kundal Plateau, and the Rana Pratap Sagar Dam is constructed at the lower end of this reach, about ( upstream of Chulia Falls. Here again, the topography permits fairly good storage upstream of the dam.

History
An integrated development planning was launched in 1953, envisaging development of the irrigation and hydropower potential (386 MW from the three power stations) as part of the Chambal River Valley Development. This planning was done during the First Five-Year Plan, 1951–1956 launched by the Government of India, after India attained independence in August 1947; the Chambal River with annual flow of  had till then remained untapped from any major developmental works.)
The planning involved utilization of the hydropower potential of the river to harness the drop of  available in the Chambal River from its source in Mhow in Madhya Pradesh up to the Kota city, which marks the exit of the river from its gorge section into the plains in Rajasthan.

While the first stage involved construction of the Gandhi Sagar Dam for creation of storage of 7,322,000,000 cubic metres and power generation and utilization of the stored waters for irrigation from the Kota Barrage in Rajasthan was initiated in 1953–54, the second stage development involved utilization of the water released from the Gandhi Sagar Dam through a second dam structure (downstream at Rawatbhata in Chittorgarh District of Rajasthan envisaging additional storage from the intermediate catchment below Gandhi Sagar Dam. The main benefit at this dam envisaged power generation at a dam toe powerhouse with installation of power plants of 172 MW capacity with four turbo generators of 43 MW capacity each. The project was completed in 1970. The power generated at this dam is shared equally with Madhya Pradesh, as the Gandhi Sagar dam provides the stored waters for utilization at this dam.

Description

The dam has created a storage capacity (Gross Storage) of 2,898,000,000 cubic metres out of which the utilizable storage (Live Storage) is 1,566,520,000 cubic metres. The dam is designed to pass a designed flood discharge of 18,408.00 m3/s through a spillway structure which is provided with 17 crest gates of 18.3 mx8.53m size above the spillway crest for the purpose. In addition, sluice gates have also been provided in the body of the dam at lower levels to remove silt deposited in the dam.

The power house is located on the left side of the spillway and consists of 4 units of 43 MW each, with firm power generation of 90 MW at 60% load factor. The water conductor system consists of penstock pipes (of  diameter) from the dam to feed the four power plants (turbo-generators) and a tailrace tunnel of  length and diameter , to lead the water back to the Chambal River. Rajasthan State has a 50% share in the power generation of this station.

The project was built at a cost of Rs 4065 million including the Power plant which involved a cost of Rs 1474 million. Funds were provided under the Colombo Plan to import the equipment from Canada. At a formal inauguration held on 9 February 1970, the project was dedicated to the nation. The power plant was transferred to the Rajasthan State Electricity Board now renamed as Rajasthan Rajya Vidyut Utpadan Nigam Limited. According to energy generation statistics reported for the period 1968–2008, the average generation was 480.6 GWh against originally planned generation of 473 GWh. Along with the Rajasthan Atomic Power Station which is located near the Rawatbhata dam and the Rana Pratap Sagar Power plant contribute to the stability of the Northern Regional Power Grid of the country.

Reservoir
The reservoir water stretch from the dam extends up to the Gandhi Sagar Dam. The Rana Pratap Sagar Reservoir, the wetland created by the dam, is identified as one of the important aquatic areas with suitable vegetation for bird life proliferation, which needs enumeration for its bird species. The reservoir area supports considerable population of resident and migratory birds.

See also

 Maharana Pratap Sagar

References

Chambal River
Hydroelectric power stations in Rajasthan
Tourist attractions in Kota, Rajasthan
Dams in Rajasthan
Memorials to Maharana Pratap
Dams on the Yamuna River
Masonry dams
Dams completed in 1970
1970 establishments in Rajasthan
20th-century architecture in India